Viva Donaldson  (12 March 1893 – 2 August 1970) was a New Zealand teacher, nurse, community leader and local politician. She was born in Auckland, New Zealand, on 12 March 1893.

In 1953, Donaldson was awarded the Queen Elizabeth II Coronation Medal. In the 1956 Queen's Birthday Honours, she was appointed a Member of the Order of the British Empire, for public services.

References

1893 births
1970 deaths
New Zealand educators
New Zealand nurses
People from Auckland
New Zealand women nurses
20th-century New Zealand politicians
Local politicians in New Zealand
New Zealand Members of the Order of the British Empire
New Zealand justices of the peace